The women's 20 kilometres race walk at the 2018 European Athletics Championships took place in Berlin on 11 August.

Records

Schedule

Results

Final

References

Race walk 20 W
Racewalking at the European Athletics Championships
Euro